Frankie Miller (born December 17, 1931, Victoria, Texas) is an American country musician.

Biography
Miller landed time singing on local station KNAL and recorded for 4 Star Records at the beginning of the 1950s, but served from 1951-53 in the United States Military during the Korean War. In 1954 he signed with Columbia Records, releasing several singles, none of which sold well. Through the latter portion of the decade, Miller performed and recorded locally, sporadically releasing singles.

In 1959 he signed with Starday Records and released several singles which became hits on the country charts, including "Blackland Farmer", "Family Man", "Baby Rocked Her Dolly", and "A Little South of Memphis". He performed on the Louisiana Hayride and the Grand Ole Opry, and was featured in Cashbox magazine.

His last charting hit came in 1964, and he recorded with United Artists in 1965, but quit the music business soon after. He worked as a car salesman in Arlington, Texas later in life. In the 1980s, Bear Family Records reissued his LPs.

Singles

External links
John Bush, [ Frankie Miller] at Allmusic

References

1931 births
Living people
American country singer-songwriters
Singer-songwriters from Texas
Country musicians from Texas
Place of birth missing (living people)